Agenore Frangipani (Benevento, 4 December 1876 – Addis Ababa, 6 April 1941) was an Italian general and colonial official, and the last Italian governor of Addis Ababa and Scioa.

Biography

Frangipani was born in 1876 to an aristocratic family, the second son of the Marquis of Mileta. He initially enlisted in the Royal Italian Navy, attending the Naval Academy of Livorno for some time, but moved to the Royal Italian Army after some time, attending the Nunziatella Military College in Naples and graduating in 1899 as Lieutenant of the Corazzieri.

In 1906 he was promoted to Captain, and on the following year he married Countess Cristina Agazzi, member of a noble Lombard family. In 1911 Frangipani fought in Libya during the Italo-Turkish War, and during World War I he fought on the Karst Plateau, being promoted to Major in 1917 and to Colonel in 1919. In 1923 he joined the National Fascist Party; in the following years he worked for the Ministry of War and served as military attaché in Berlin and Paris until 1930. He also served as official in the colonial administrator in Italy's East African colonies for many years (in 1922 he signed a treaty with Arthur Wallace Skrine, British deputy governor of Kassala province, rectifying the border between Eritrea and Sudan), as well as consul in Ethiopia.

During the second half of the 1930s he fought in the Second Italo-Ethiopian War, being promoted to Major General in 1936, then in the Spanish Civil War and finally in the conquest of Albania. At the outbreak of World War II he was in Italian East Africa, and on 3 April 1941 he replaced Giuseppe Daodice as governor of Addis Ababa and the Scioa Governorate. He was ordered by the Duke of Aosta, Viceroy of Italian East Africa, to surrender Addis Ababa to the advancing British forces without fighting, in order to spare the civilian population; he reluctantly carried out this order on 6 April 1941, but on the same day, feeling dishonored, he committed suicide.

References

1876 births
1941 deaths
Italian generals
Italian military personnel of World War I
Italian military personnel of World War II
Italian military personnel of the Second Italo-Ethiopian War
Italian military personnel of the Italo-Turkish War
Italian colonial governors and administrators
1941 suicides
Suicides in Ethiopia
Italian military personnel who committed suicide